was a Japanese actress, who was a member of the all-female musical-performing Takarazuka Revue during the 1930s and the 1940s, best known for her role as an officer's widow in the wartime film , and for being part of the  or Cherry Blossom Unit of traveling shingeki play actors who died as a result of the 1945 Hiroshima bombing.

The fate of the Cherry Blossom Unit was later dramatized by playwright Hisashi Inoue, and also made into a feature film by director Kaneto Shindo.

The actress appears to have had a long-held desire to perform shingeki plays, but that was not economically viable due to the need to her support her parents and siblings. As a Takarazienne, she had the manga comic artist Osamu Tezuka as a childhood fan who lived on her block, and Astro Boy may have been influenced by Sonoi's performance of Pinochio　("Pinocchio") from April to May, 1942.

Biography

Early life
Keiko Sonoi was born  on 6 August 1913 in Matsuo, a village in Iwate Prefecture.

She moved to Morioka to stay with her uncle 's family, in order to attend the "upper elementary school" there.

Later, she and her uncle moved to Otaru, where she attended .

Her real name was "Tomi", as officially registered in her koseki (family register).  But during childhood, this name provoked the taunting of other children, who chanted the line  from the kabuki play . She therefore decided to re-christen herself , by which she was exclusively known as during her time in the Takarazuka Revue. She later called herself , and her last letter, written four days before her death, was signed with that name. She allegedly chose these aliases from being immersed in onomancy, a type of fortune-telling based on the name.

Takarazuka aspirations 

She learned of the existence of the all-girl Takarazuka Revue through girl's magazines, and by the time she graduated (upper) elementary school, she wished to join this musical revue theatrical company, but this was foiled when her mother opposed the decision.

However, that would be a road to economic hardship, and instead she entered the Takarazuka School, which paid even first-year students (yoka-sei) a 10 yen (or 15 yen) monthly salary, most of which she would send to her family.

As a student she earned the nickname Hakama from her real name Hakamada,  and was particularly close to her roommate .

Takarazuka Revue 

She was assigned to the  group, and initially performed under the stage name of Kiyono Kasanui making the stage debut in Haru no odori in April. She changed her stage name later that year to Keiko Sonoko.

After graduating in 1931, she was assigned to the Tsuki-gumi (Moon) then moved to other troops. In October, she was cast as the old gate-keeper lady in 's Lilac Time, and was praised as "the greatest (fruit of my endeavor) this year" by Ichizō Kobayashi, the head of the Hankyu-Toho conglomerate.

Typecasting

She became recognized as a skilled and versatile supporting actress, especially in comedic roles. Other comments include: "Not flashy but giving a 'flavorful' performance"(Yoshio Sakurauchi, politician well known as zuka-fans), "Skillfully executes cheery, witty roles" (Ken Harada, another politician), "Skillfully executes cheery, witty roles" (Issei Hisamatsu, Takarazuka stage director and writer).

Because she was considered too small of stature for male roles, but largish for female roles, she became type-cast for the sanmaime (a short-of- handsome, comic male) or elderly role. Even though one Takarazuka director,  asserted that the Revue had precious few sanmaime talents, and  "only the truly skilled can execute sanmaime parts", Sonoi herself despised being called sanmaime.

Takarazuka Films 
In 1938, Takarazuka Films was established, and she was cast in several of its movies, until the production company was forced to shut down in 1941 as the war-times situation turned more serious.

Playing outside repertoires 

In January 1941, Sonoi and Toho Studio movie star Hideko Takamine made guest appearances in theatrical productions by comedian Roppa Furukawa's company in Tokyo. This received notice as the first time a current Takarazuka member was seconded to appear on stage elsewhere. According to some sources, Sonoi was specially picked out by playwright  who wrote for Roppa's troupe; Kikuta had already regarded Sonoi as a promising talent and insisted she be cast in his Sekijūji-ki wa sususmu at Takarazuka in 1940.

Leaving Takarazuka 
Around this time, Sonoi had already indicated her inclination to convert to Shingeki acting. Correspondence from Jūzaburō Yoshioka at the Tokyo Takarazuka office shows that management was aware she "wanted to do plays like the Tsukiji" (Tsukiji Little Theater, i.e., shingeki plays), but Yoshioka suggested she settle for performing with Roppa for the time being.

The Takarazuka Revue tried to retain her by offering her terms that would allow her some leeway to perform in film or shingeki theater, but the compensation and performing restrictions they offered were unsatisfactory, according to her correspondence to Shizu Nakai.

Film role in Matsu 

The film became a box office hit.

The child actor billed as Akio Sawamura (actor Hiroyuki Nagato of later years) said he earnestly wished he could marry a woman like Sonoi.

The director, Hiroshi Inagaki recalled that Takako Irie and  had been the first choices for the role but were not available, and the offer was made to Sonoi on Sayo's recommendation.

Due to success of this film, Daiei offered Sonoi a studio contract, but she declined saying she preferred to continue studying with her theatrical company, Kuraku-za (cf. below). The director, Hiroshi Inagaki was eager to sign Sonoi onto his new projects at the time; in later years, the director reflected that Sonoi was "not so much a skilled performer as someone with a passion for performing. She had the basics of inhabiting the persona of her role, down pat".

Non-musical theater 

Of the initial run of three plays, Sonoi was cast in Genkanburo ("entryway bath"). She continued performing for the troupe, appearing in Yume no su ("Dream's nest", 2nd run, June 1943 at the ), Eien no otto ("Eternal husband". 3rd run, January 1944 at the Kokumin Shingekijo).

Sonoi played the widow's role as in the movie when the troupe produced the theater adaptation of Muhōmatsu no isshō, first in Kuraku-za's 4th run at Hōgakuza in October 1944, after which the troupe took this play on the road, traveling through a large part of Western Japan.

After the regional tour finished in December, the bombing raids intensified in Tokyo and food procurement became difficult. The Kuraku-za decided to disband, but Maruyama suggested the members regroup as a traveling troupe with the objective of  the populace beleaguered by war, and twelve other actors joined. But this name was not made official until June 1945 after they became stationed at Hiroshima.

The mobile troupe was only able to do a grand tour briefly, from January to March 1946, travelling to parts of the Kanto area and then Hiroshima. In Kanto they mainly visited manufacturing plant workers, but in Hiroshima they "comfort-visited" wounded soldiers as well.
The Nihon Ido Engeki Renmei (Japan Touring Theatre League) then instructed all troupes to cease touring city by city, and perform in the confines of an evacuation (sokai) area. It was decided Kuraku-za would be assigned to stay in Hiroshima or its vicinity.

Hiroshima 

The choice of Hiroshima as their evacuation zone was a source of consternation for members, because the city remained relatively unscathed despite its military strategic importance, and a major strike was thought imminent. Sonoi wrote in April stating that she tried to refuse going to Hiroshima and remain in Tokyo (which had been incinerated in the March bombing), but was pressured to change her mind. Also while she was still at Tokyo, she went to the Toho Studio office asking if there were any film roles for her, which she wanted to take to extricate herself from touring under heavy bombardment. In fact director Kajirō Yamamoto was hoping to cast her in his new film (Kaidanji) but the office replied no, and she had left.

The Kuraku-za's mobile unit, now officially renamed  reached Hiroshima on June 22. From July 5, they toured the San'in region. Due to illness, the troupe returned to Hiroshima prematurely ahead of schedule. This marked the end of performance by the Sakura-tai.

Members either dropped out of Sakura-tai or left Hiroshima, so that in August only 9 members remained at their office in Hiroshima. Sonoi spent time recuperating in Kobe (at the home of Shizu Nakai and husband Yoshio) August 2 to August 5, returning to Hiroshima on the fateful day.

Thus Sonoi, Maruyama and others were in Hiroshima when the Atomic Bomb was dropped on August 6, 1945. They both succumbed to the aftereffects shortly thereafter.

Hiroshima A-bomb 
When the Atomic bomb was dropped on Hiroshima, Sonoi was thrown from the hallway to the yard by the blast, and momentarily lost consciousness, but otherwise had no visible wounds. Sadao Maruyama and Midori Naka also left the scene, each separately, but were in poor condition were taken into custody at different locations. The remains of the five others members were found skeletonized at the burning wreck of the office.

Sonoi and Takayama subsequently took the train and reached the Nakai residence in Kobe. Sonoi's face and clothing were soiled, and she wore a jika-tabi on one foot and a man's shoe on the other, so that she looked "like a beggar" and was nearly beyond recognition.

On August 15, when informed the war had ended, Sonoi expressed her gladness at being able to act to her hearts content to Akiko Utsumi who was visiting, and also wrote a letter dated August 17 to her mother Kame in Morioka expressing this sentiment.

However, Sonoi's condition deteriorated. Her hair started to fall off at night, before suffering high fever around August 19, according to Mrs. Nakai; Other symptoms such as hematochezia, internal bleeding and delusions also presented.

By August 19,  who was a stage director for Sakura-tai tracked Sonoi down, and came to see her at the Nakai residence. Sonoi asked of news about Maruyama, and sensed he must have passed away. On August 21, Sonoi's fever reached 40 degrees C, and Mrs. Utsumi rushed out to procure ice. Sonoi felt the coolness of the chilled gauze, and said "Oh, how good it feels". Those were the last words she uttered before she died.

Sonoi's remains were cremated the following day, and her bones and ashes buried in Onryū-ji in Morioka.

The story of the Sakura-tai's demise was written up in a book by author  in 1980, which was adapted into the film Sakura-tai chiru (1988) directed by Kaneto Shindō.

Legacy 

Influence on Tezuka's art
The childhood home of manga artist Osamu Tezuka in Takarazuka, Hyogo belonged to a row of houses dubbed "Musical Theater Tenements" (Kageki nagaya), and Tezuka recalls that Keiko Sonoi lived at the end of this block. The manga Ribbon no kishi (Princess Knight) was "totally nostalgia of the Takarazuka Revue", in the comic book artist's own words.

Matsuo village
In 1989 her birthplace Matsuo, Iwate commemorated the centennial of the founding of the village by holding an exhibit of Sonoi's belongings and related printed paraphernalia, publishing a scrapbook compilation entitled Shiryōshū.

Related works 
  Sakura-tai zemetsu (1980), a non-fiction account of the demise of the troupe.
 Kaneto Shindo dir.,  (1988 film), based on Ezu's non-fiction.
 Hisashi Inoue's play  (first run in 1997).

See also
 Midori Naka

Explanatory notes

References
Citations

Bibliography

External links 
 

1913 births
1945 deaths
Hibakusha
Victims of radiological poisoning
Actors from Iwate Prefecture
20th-century Japanese actresses
Japanese civilians killed in World War II